The Texas Country Music Hall of Fame, located in Carthage in Panola County in East Texas, honors those who have made outstanding contributions to country music and were born in the state of Texas. This includes singers, songwriters, disc jockeys, and others.

In the center of the exhibit area, a replica of a 1930s theater marquee reminds visitors of the role of country music in film. A juke box nearby allows visitors to select the country songs that they wish to hear played while touring the museum.

The marquee serves as the entrance to the Tex Ritter Museum. A native of Panola County, Ritter was one of the first singers inducted into the hall of fame when it was established in 1998. It also has an exhibit on Ritter's son, John Ritter.

Inductees

1998
Tex Ritter
Willie Nelson
Jim Reeves
Gene Autry
Joe Allison
Cindy Walker
1999
Ernest Tubb
Hank Thompson
Waylon Jennings
2000
Dale Evans
Bob Wills
Charlie Walker
2001
Stuart Hamblin
Billy Walker
Ray Price
2002
Tanya Tucker
Gene Watson
Nat Stuckey

2003
Kris Kristofferson
Lefty Frizzell
Johnny Bush
2004
The Big Bopper
Johnny Lee
Mac Davis
2005
Roger Miller
Jimmy Dean
Johnny Gimble
Glenn Sutton
2006
The Gatlin Brothers
Billy Joe Shaver
2007
Johnny Rodriguez
Red Steagall
Bob Luman
2008
Mickey Newbury
Buck Owens
The Whites

2009
Linda Davis
Michael Martin Murphey
Neal McCoy
2010
George Jones
Al Dexter
Ray Winkler
2011
Mickey Gilley
Moe Bandy
2014
Duane Allen and The Oak Ridge Boys
2015
Tracy Byrd
Dallas Wayne
2016
Clint Black
2017
Kenny Rogers
Bobbie Nelson
2018
Leon Rausch
The Chuck Wagon Gang
2019
Jeannie C. Riley
Rodney Crowell
Claude Gray

See also
 List of music museums
 List of museums in East Texas

References

External links
Official website

American country music
Music halls of fame
Halls of fame in Texas
State halls of fame in the United States
Music museums in the United States
Biographical museums in Texas
Museums in Panola County, Texas
Awards established in 1998
Country music awards
Country music museums